A keychain (also key fob or keyring) is a small ring or chain of metal to which several keys can be attached. The length of a keychain allows an item to be used more easily than if connected directly to a keyring. Some keychains allow one or both ends to rotate, keeping the keychain from becoming twisted, while the item is being used.

A keychain can also be a connecting link between a keyring and the belt of an individual. It is usually employed by personnel whose job demands frequent use of keys, such as a security guard, prison officer, janitor, or retail store manager. The chain is often retractable, and therefore may be a nylon rope, instead of an actual metal chain. The chain ensures that the keys remain attached to the individual using them, makes accidental loss less likely, and saves on wear and tear on the pockets of the user.

Use of keychains

Keychains are one of the most common souvenir and advertising items. Keychains are commonly used to promote businesses. A standard advertising keychain will carry the business's name and contact information, and often a logo.

In the 1950s and 1960s, with the improvement of plastic manufacturing techniques, promotional items including keychains became unique. Businesses could place their names on promotional keychains that were three-dimensional for less cost than the standard metal keychains.

Keychains are small and inexpensive enough to become promotional items for larger national companies that might give them out by the millions. For example, with the launch of a new movie or television show, those companies might partner with food companies to provide a character keychain in each box of cereal.

Keychains that currently hold keys are an item that is never long misplaced by the owner. People sometimes attach their keychain to their belt (or belt loop) to avoid loss or to allow quick access to it. Many keychains also offer functions that the owner wants easily accessible as well. These include an army knife, bottle opener, an electronic organizer, scissors, address book, family photos, nail clipper, pill case and even pepper spray. Modern cars often include a keychain that serves as a remote to lock/unlock the car or even start the engine. An electronic key finder is also a useful item found on many keys that will beep when summoned for quick finding when misplace

Keyring 

A keyring or "split ring" is a circle cotter that holds keys and other small items, which are sometimes connected to keychains. Other types of keyrings are made of leather, wood and rubber. Keyrings were invented in the 19th century by Samuel Harrison. The most common form of the keyring is a single piece of metal in a 'double loop'. Either end of the loop can be pried open to allow a key to be inserted and slid along the spiral until it becomes wholly engaged onto the ring. Novelty carabiners are also commonly used as keyrings for ease of access and exchange. Often the keyring is adorned with a key fob for self-identification. Other forms of rings may use a single loop of metal or plastic with a mechanism to open and securely close the loop.

Key fob 

A key fob is a generally decorative and at times useful item many people often carry with their keys, on a ring or a chain, for ease of tactile identification, to provide a better grip, or to make a personal statement. The word fob may be linked to the low German dialect for the word Fuppe, meaning "pocket"; however, the real origin of the word is uncertain. Fob pockets (meaning 'sneak proof' from the German word foppen) were pockets meant to deter thieves. A short "fob chain" was used to attach to items, like a pocket watch, placed in these pockets. 

Fobs vary considerably in size, style and functionality. Most commonly they are simple discs of smooth metal or plastic, typically with a message or symbol such as that of a logo (as with conference trinkets) or a sign of an important group affiliation. A fob may be symbolic or strictly aesthetic, but it can also be a small tool. Many fobs are small flashlights, compasses, calculators, penknives, discount cards, bottle openers, security tokens, and USB flash drives. As electronic technology continues to become smaller and cheaper, miniature key-fob versions of (previously) larger devices are becoming common, such as digital photo frames, remote control units for garage door openers, barcode scanners and simple video games (e.g. Tamagotchi) or other gadgets such as breathalyzers.

Some retail establishments such as gasoline stations keep their bathrooms locked and customers must ask for the key from the attendant. In such cases the key often has a very large fob so that customers will not automatically pocket and walk off with the key after completing their ablutions. Key fobs offering added functionalities connected to online services may require additional subscription payment to access them.

Access control key fobs

Access control key fobs are electronic key fobs that are used for controlling access to buildings or vehicles. They are used for activating such things as remote keyless entry systems on motor vehicles. Early electric key fobs operated using infrared and required a clear line-of-sight to function. These could be copied using a programmable remote control. More recent models use challenge–response authentication over radio frequency, so these are harder to copy and do not need line-of-sight to operate. Programming these remotes sometimes requires the automotive dealership to connect a diagnostic tool, but many of them can be self-programmed by following a sequence of steps in the vehicle and usually requires at least one working key.

Key fobs are used in apartment buildings and condominium buildings for controlling access to common areas (for example, lobby doors, storage areas, fitness room, pool). These usually contain a passive RFID tag. The fob operates in much the same manner as a proximity card to communicate (via a reader pad) with a central server for the building, which can be programmed to allow access only to those areas in which the tenant or owner is permitted to access, or only within certain time frames.

Remote workers may also use a security token – an electronic device often referred to as a fob – that provides one part of a three-way match to log in over an unsecure computer network connection to a secure network. (A well-known example is the RSA SecurID token.) This kind of key fob may have a keypad on which the user must enter a PIN to retrieve an access code, or it could be a display-only device.

RFID key fobs can be easily cloned with tools like the Proxmark3, and there are several companies in America that offer this service.

Costs 

The cost of keychains in the United States varies widely depending on their purpose. Advertising keychains begin at only a few cents a piece to a few dollars each. They are normally purchased in large quantities, often over 500 at a time.

Keychains are found in retail stores to represent things such as television shows, movies, video games, nostalgia, hobbies, interests, and personalities. These keychains cost from US$1 up to US$10 and more.

Electronic keychains including games and small organizers start at a few dollars and can be up to US$50. Other keychain electronics including cameras, digital photo frames, and USB drives cost US$10 to US$100.

Souvenir keychains are popular. They represent a trip or a location that a person is visiting. These typically cost between US$1 and US$10.

As a collectible item 
The most popular focused keychain collections are advertising, souvenir, monument, popular characters and nostalgia-related items.

Collectors display and store their keychains in several different ways. Some collections are small enough that the collector can place all of their keychains on their standard key ring. Some larger collections can be stored and displayed on dowels, cork boards, tool racks, on large link chains, in display cases, hung on walls, displayed on Christmas trees. Some collections are large enough that entire rooms are dedicated to the keychain collection.

According to Guinness World Records, the largest collection of keychains consists of 62,257 items, achieved by Angel Alvarez Cornejo in Sevilla, Spain, as verified on 25 June 2016. His collection began at the age of 7. Due to the tremendous size of his collection he now stores his keychains in his garage and a rented warehouse.

The previous record holder was Brent Dixon of Georgia, United States with the largest collection of keychains, at 41,418 non-duplicated ones.

Keychains don't hold their value as well as other collections. A standard keychain that was purchased for five dollars new may only be worth less than a dollar once it has been owned regardless of condition.

Computer keychains 
By analogy to the physical object, the terms keychain and keyring are often used for software that stores cryptographic keys. The term keychain was first introduced in a series of IBM developerWorks articles. The term is used in GNU Privacy Guard to store known keys on a keyring. Mac OS X uses a password storage system called Keychain. A "keyring" is also the name of a password manager application working under the GNOME desktop manager (used for example in Ubuntu operating system). In cryptography a keyring is a database of multiple keys or passwords. There are also portable password manager programs, such as Keepass and KeePassX.

See also
 Key finder

References

External links 

Domestic implements
Locksmithing